Rugby union at the 2007 Southeast Asian Games was held in the Suranaree Camp Stadium, Nakhon Ratchasima, Thailand.

Medal table

Medalists

External links

Rugby union
2007
International rugby union competitions hosted by Thailand
2007 in Asian rugby union